Babo Avalishvili-Kherkheulidze (1851-1900) was a Georgian stage actress. She belonged to the first generation of star actors of the Georgian national stage, the Rustaveli Theater.

She was engaged at the Tbilisi theater when it was opened in 1879. She was the first female actor to perform within dramatic tragedy on the stage of the theater.

References 

19th-century actors from Georgia (country)
19th-century women from Georgia (country)
Actresses from Georgia (country)
1851 births
1900 deaths
19th-century actresses